Hızır is a Turkish spelling and variant of Arabic masculine given name Khidr. 

Notable people with this name include:

Given name
 Kurtoğlu Hızır Reis, Ottoman admiral
 Hızır Reis, later Hayreddin Barbarossa, Ottoman admiral

Turkish masculine given names